Novo-Georgiyevskoye is a rural locality (a selo) in Kichmegnskoye Rural Settlement, Kichmengsko-Gorodetsky District, Vologda Oblast, Russia. The population was 10 as of 2002.

Geography 
Novo-Georgiyevskoye is located 32 km southwest of Kichmengsky Gorodok (the district's administrative centre) by road. Kurilovo is the nearest rural locality.

References 

Rural localities in Kichmengsko-Gorodetsky District